Greece competed at the 2015 World Aquatics Championships in Kazan, Russia from 24 July to 9 August 2015.

Medalists

Diving

Greek divers qualified for the individual spots at the World Championships.

Men

Women

Open water swimming

Greece has nominated four swimmers to compete in the open water marathon. Among the official roster featured four-time Olympians Marianna Lymperta and defending World champion Spyridon Gianniotis in the 10 km open water.

Swimming

Greek swimmers have achieved qualifying standards in the following events (up to a maximum of 2 swimmers in each event at the A-standard entry time, and 1 at the B-standard):

Men

Women

Synchronized swimming

Greece fielded a full team of twelve synchronized swimmers to compete in each of the following events.

Women

Water polo

Men's tournament

Team roster

Konstantinos Flegkas
Emmanouil Mylonakis
Georgios Dervisis
Konstantinos Genidounias
Ioannis Fountoulis
Kyriakos Pontikeas
Christos Afroudakis
Evangelos Delakas
Konstantinos Mourikis
Christodoulos Kolomvos
Alexandros Gounas
Angelos Vlachopoulos
Stefanos Galanopoulos

Group play

Quarterfinals

Semifinals

Third place game

Women's tournament

Team roster

Eleni Kouvdou
Christina Tsoukala
Stefania Charalampidi
Christina Kotsia
Margarita Plevritou
Alkisti Avramidou
Alexandra Asimaki
Antigoni Roumpesi
Ioanna Charalampidi
Triantafyllia Manolioudaki
Eleftheria Plevritou
Eleni Xenaki
Chrysoula Diamantopoulou

Group play

Playoffs

Quarterfinals

5th–8th place semifinals

Fifth place game

References

External links
KOE (Hellenic Swimming Federation) 

Nations at the 2015 World Aquatics Championships
2015 in Greek sport
Greece at the World Aquatics Championships